Pierre Jourdan (21 September 1932 – 16 August 2007)  born Pierre Gendre in Cannes, was an actor and director.

Honours
 CableACE Awards, 1987

Filmography

As director
 1968: Phèdre
 1972: Le Trouvère
 1972: Un danseur: Rudolph Nureyev (I Am a Dancer)
 1974: Norma
 1974: Tristan und Isolde
 1977: Aida
 1979: Fidelio
 1982: Ciboulette (TV)
 1990: Manon Lescaut (TV)
 1990: La Légende de Joseph en Égypte (TV)
 1991: Henry VIII (TV)
 1992: Christobal Colomb (TV)
 1994: Une éducation manquée (TV)
 1994: Le Songe d'une nuit d'été (TV)
 1994: J'aime le music-hall (TV)
 1994: De Serge Gainsbourg à Gainsbarre de 1958 - 1991 (vidéo)
 1994: La Colombe (télévision) (TV)
 1995: Le Domino noir (TV)
 1996: Mignon (TV)
 1996: Llanto por Ignacio Sanchez (TV)
 1996: Médée (TV)
 1997: Les Noces de Figaro (TV)
 1998: La Jolie Fille de Perth (TV)
 1999: Pelléas et Mélisande (TV)
 1999: Les Diamants de la couronne (TV)
 2005: Noé (TV)
 2006: Les caprices de Marianne by Henri Sauguet after Alfred de Musset, (Théâtre impérial de Compiègne)

References

1932 births
2007 deaths